Mateusz Szymorek (born 4 November 1993) is a Polish professional footballer who plays as a defender for IV liga club GKS Bełchatów.

Playing career
Szymorek made his way up the ranks of his hometown team, GKS Bełchatów. He was called up to the reserve side from the U19 team in July 2011. After two season, he signed a two-year contract with the first team, which was playing in the second tier I liga. He made his debut on 4 August 2013, when Bełchatów played Brzesko to a 1-1 draw. He came in as a 74' substitute for Łukasz Wroński. They finished as league champions for the 2013–14 season, and were promoted to Ekstraklasa for the following season.

Szymorek made his top league debut in a 0-2 home loss against Podbeskidzie on 16 May 2015, playing the full 90 minutes.

He signed a two-year contract extension with Bełchatów in July 2015.

In August 2017, Szymorek signed with III liga side Olimpia Zambrów, although he returned to Bełchatów in July 2018 after playing in 33 matches.

On 1 March 2022, it was announced Szymorek signed with III liga club Podhale Nowy Targ.

On 31 July 2022, he returned to GKS Bełchatów following the club's demotion from II liga to IV liga.

References

External links
 
 
 

Living people
1993 births
Polish footballers
Association football defenders
GKS Bełchatów players
Olimpia Zambrów players
Ekstraklasa players
I liga players
II liga players
III liga players
Sportspeople from Bełchatów